American Affairs is a quarterly American political journal founded in February 2017 by Julius Krein. The editors describe the journal as blending the literature and philosophy of the Claremont Review of Books with the political interests of National Affairs. 

Its project has been described in Tablet as: "a dense, technically sophisticated form of neo-Hamiltonian economic nationalism, pushed in various forms by Michael Lind, David P. Goldman, and Krein himself," based on the contention that "a short-sighted American elite has allowed the country’s manufacturing core—the key to both widespread domestic prosperity and national security in the face of a mercantilist China—to be hollowed out," just as "Production and technical expertise have shifted to China and Asia, domestic capital has flowed into unproductive share buybacks or tech schemes (Uber, WeWork), and America has become a country with a two-tiered service economy, with bankers, consultants, and software engineers at the top and Walmart greeters and Uber drivers at the bottom."

Since its founding in 2017, American Affairs has become known for in-depth articles on trade and industrial policy, advocacy of family childcare allowances and infrastructure spending, as well as for bringing together right and left-wing critics of neoliberalism. Aside from economic policy, it has also covered history, political theory and cultural criticism. It has been characterized in the New Statesman as a "heterodox policy journal" featuring, for instance, conservative arguments in favor of a greater role for the state alongside left-wing arguments against identity politics and open borders. Notable articles include Krein's "The Real Class War" which "attracted attention from both left and right in November 2019 by upending the conversation over class in the Democratic primary."

History
A predecessor to American Affairs is the Journal of American Greatness, a short-lived 2016 political blog best known for publishing "The Flight 93 Election," a widely read essay about the 2016 presidential election by the pseudonymous author Publius Decius Mus, later revealed to be Michael Anton.

American Affairs was initially considered by some as a "pro-Trump journal [launched] in an effort to give the Trump movement some intellectual heft". But in 2017, Krein wrote an opinion article in The New York Times publicly acknowledging his regret in voting for the candidate. Jennifer Schuessler of The New York Times writes: "the magazine seeks to fill the void left by a conservative intellectual establishment more focused on opposing Mr. Trump than on grappling with the rejection of globalism and free-market dogma that propelled his victory."

Contributors

Notable contributors to the magazine include a range of figures from across the political and ideological spectrum, such as: Michael Anton, Robert D. Atkinson, Mehrsa Baradaran, Thierry Baudet, Daniel A. Bell, Fred Block, Christopher Caldwell, Oren Cass, Angelo M. Codevilla, Colin Crouch, Patrick J. Deneen, Ronald W. Dworkin, Fredrik Erixon, Nancy Fraser, Amber A'Lee Frost, Frank Furedi, Maurice Glasman, James K. Galbraith, David P. Goldman, Allen C. Guelzo, Ofir Haivry, Shadi Hamid, James Hankins, Yoram Hazony, Joseph Heath, Arthur Herman, John B. Judis, Eric Kaufmann, Joel Kotkin, Ryszard Legutko, Michael Lind, Edward Luttwak, Bruno Maçães, Noel Malcolm, Pierre Manent, Lawrence M. Mead, Bill Mitchell, Angela Nagle, Eric A. Posner, R.R. Reno, Ganesh Sitaraman, Anne-Marie Slaughter, Matthew Stoller, Wolfgang Streeck, Cass Sunstein, Ruy Teixiera, Nick Timothy, Roberto M. Unger, Adrian Vermeule, L. Randall Wray, and Slavoj Zizek.

References

External links
 

Political magazines published in the United States
Magazines established in 2017
Conservative magazines published in the United States
Quarterly magazines published in the United States
Magazines published in Boston